Ardshinbank is an Armenian commercial bank. The full name of the bank is "Industrial Construction Bank" closed joint-stock company (CJSC).

History 
Ardshinbank was founded in 2002. In February 2003 it received a banking license
no. 83 (dated 25.02.03). Originally Ardshinbank was called "Ardshininvestbank". In
November 2014 it was rebranded into "Ardshinbank" CJSC.

Ardshinbank is a universal financial and credit institution offering a full range of
banking services. The priority areas include project financing for large corporate
customers, primarily in the strategic industries and energy sector of Armenia, as
well as lending to small and medium-sized businesses, emission and service of
plastic cards, e-banking, international money transfers, as well as mortgage lending
to different population groups and salary projects. In addition, the bank is actively
developing electronic and mobile banking services, which make it possible to carry
out main banking operations 24/7.

Ardshinbank has ratings from two international rating agencies - Moody's and Fitch,
equal to the rating of Sovereign.

Ardshinbank is an RA securities market participant and an agent in the government
bonds markets. It is the first private entity in Armenia to issue eurobonds in the
amount US$100 million (in formats RegS/144A).

With its 60 branches, the bank has one of the largest branch networks in the country, in addition to a representative office in Paris. As of January 2019, the bank has 1,089 employees.

Founders and shareholders 
Founders: “Rasco-Armenia” CJSC, “Center for Business Investments” LLC
Shareholders: Karen Safaryan, the owner of 100% of the shares of “Region” CJSC,
who in turn is the only participant of “Arins Group” LLC (on 06.06.2017 “Center for
Business Investments” LLC was renamed to  "Arins Group" LLC); individuals.

Participation in financial market 
Member of Union of Banks of Armenia, Armenian-Georgian Association of Business
Cooperation, NASDAQ OMX ARMENIA OJSC, Association of Armenian Mortgage
Market Participants, affiliated member of MasterCard Europay, principal member of
Visa International payment system, shareholder of SWIFT International Financial
Telecommunication System, “Armenian Card” CJSC, settlement system of the RA
Central Depository.

Awards and recognition 
2005 - Citigroup's diploma of quality for executing dollar payments via Citibank New York

2005/2006 - Diploma of the best dealer in managing domestic debt of the Ministry of Finance and Economy and the Central Bank of Armenia

2009 - Certificate of MoneyGram International money transfer system as the most reliable bank of Armenia

2010 - Citibank's prize for high quality of money transfers in USD. Commerzbank's prize for high quality of money transfers in euro.

2014 - “Bank of the Year” from the British magazine “The Banker”.

2015 - "Best Bank in Armenia for the year of 2015" from the British magazine “Euromoney”.

2016 - “Most Active Issuing Bank in Armenia in 2016” under the EBRD's Trade Facilitation Program (TFP) from the European Bank for Reconstruction and Development (EBRD)

2017 - “Safest Bank in Armenia for 2017” from the American magazine “Global Finance”. “Best Foreign Exchange Provider in Armenia for 2017” from the American magazine “Global Finance” “Best Bank in Armenia for 2018” from the American magazine “Global Finance”. “TFP Momentum Award” from the Asian Development Bank.

2018 - “Safest Bank in Armenia for 2018’ from the American magazine “Global Finance”.  “Most active partner of Eikon platform” from Thomson Reuters.

2019 - “Best Bank in Armenia in 2019” by the American magazine “Global Finance”. “Most Active Issuing Bank in Armenia in 2018” from the International Investment Bank (IIB).  “Best Bank in Armenia in 2018” from the British magazine “The Banker”

Mergers and acquisitions 
During March–May 2003, Ardshinbank acquired a significant share of the assets and liabilities of the OJSC “Ardshinbank”, including its 24 branches. Later, In November of the same year, Ardshinbank purchased the main part of OJSC “Agrobank”, including its 35 branches and the rest of infrastructure.

In 2016, the "Region" Finance Industrial Corporation CJSC, whose sole shareholder is Karen Safaryan, the sole beneficiary and the Chairman of the Board of "Ardshinbank" CJSC, acquired 100% shares of "Areximbank-Gazprombank Group" CJSC from its sole shareholder, the Russian “Gazprombank”. Thus, Areximbank and its entire branch network (16) merged with Ardshinbank.

See also

Economy of Armenia
List of banks
List of banks in Armenia

References

Additional Links
 https://d2tyltutevw8th.cloudfront.net/media/document/best-banks-in-asia-pacific-2019-1552488790.pdf
 https://finport.am/full_news.php?id=36503&lang=3
 https://d2tyltutevw8th.cloudfront.net/media/document/press-release-global-finance-names-the-safest-ban-1537284512.pdf
 https://www.tert.am/en/news/2019/04/03/Fitch/2963881 
 https://www.ardshinbank.am/sites/default/files/reports/Ardshinbank%20Final%20FS_2018.pdf
 https://www.moodys.com/credit-ratings/Ardshinbank-CJSC-credit-rating-809510108
 https://news.am/eng/news/484226.html
 https://www.fitchratings.com/site/pr/987792
 http://cbonds.com/emissions/issue/156987

External links
 ashib.am Official site

Banks of Armenia